Jeffrey Cammon (born December 25, 1979) is an American basketball coach who is currently the head women's basketball coach at California State University, Long Beach, a role he has held since 2017.

Coaching career 
Cammon began his coaching career at Diamond Ranch High School in California as an assistant before spending time as an assistant at Alcorn State, Chaffey Community College, and Kentucky Wesleyan. He returned to California to coach the women's varsity team at Bishop Alemany High School, where he was also a history teacher.

After two seasons at Bishop Alemany, Cammon joined the coaching staff of first-year head coach Jody Wynn at Long Beach State. He spent five seasons with the program before moving on spend a season each with California and Colorado.

Long Beach State (second stint) 
Cammon was named the head coach at Long Beach State on May 11, 2017, replacing Wynn.

Head coaching record

College

High school

References

External links 
 
 Long Beach State profile

1979 births
Living people
People from Pomona, California
Basketball players from California
Basketball coaches from California
Alcorn State Braves basketball players
High school basketball coaches in California
Alcorn State Braves basketball coaches
Chaffey Panthers men's basketball coaches
Kentucky Wesleyan Panthers men's basketball coaches
Long Beach State Beach women's basketball coaches
California Golden Bears women's basketball coaches
Colorado Buffaloes women's basketball coaches